The State University of Goiás (Portuguese: Universidade Estadual de Goiás, UEG) is a publicly funded university located in the Brazilian state of Goiás, headed in Anápolis and with campuses in 42 cities. The university was founded in 1999, and it's one of the 3 public universities of Goiás (besides the Federal University of Goiás, and Rio Verde University).

References

External links 

  

Education in Goiás
1999 establishments in Brazil
Educational institutions established in 1999
State universities in Brazil
Anápolis